Nzadi is a commune of the city of Boma in the Democratic Republic of the Congo.

Populated places in Kongo Central
Democratic Republic of Congo geography articles needing translation from French Wikipedia
Communes of the Democratic Republic of the Congo